Paloma Carrasco (born February 12, 1996) is an American singer, and songwriting musician in Regional Mexican Music. Carrasco was born Chicago, Illinois, to Mexican parents Angelica and Ricardo Carrasco. Paloma has 2 younger sisters, Karla and Natalie. Paloma is known for the reality shows Va Por Ti(in the year 2014) and Tengo Talento, Mucho Talento (in the year 2012)

On February 12, 2014 the singer took out a single called No Te Vayas Nunca and is currently working on material for an album.

In December 2014, Carrasco performed in Times Square for the Univision's New Year Special.

Personal life 

Carrasco was only 12 when she suffered a great loss in her family. "I remember like it was yesterday.." she states. Paloma went to Jane Addams Elementary School in the east side, and graduated to then attend Chicago High School for the Arts or as they call it ChiArts. After graduating from ChiArts, Carrasco went straight to The Show Va Por Ti, and is currently working on new material for her album.

Music career 

Paloma Carrasco began performing in local parties in her neighborhood, and grew to know that this was not just a hobby, but a true passion. After being accepted into the Chicago High School For Arts, she quickly auditioned for the Andrew Bird Scholarship to private vocal lessons, and got a chance to perform by Andrew Bird's side in the Back of the yard festival in 2010. Since then she has performed at side by Diana Reyes, Yuri, Jencarlos Canela, and Emmanuel. But has also performed in front of Ricky Martin, Jencarlos Canela, Larry Hernandez, Alejandra Guzman, El Dasa, Dulce Maria, Pepe Aguilar, Mario Domm, Yuri, Emmanuel, Ricardo Montaner, Shaila Durcal, Alfonso Lizarraga, William Levy, JBalvin, and Thalia.

References 
 http://palomacarrasco.net/index.html
 http://www.univision.com/shows/va-por-ti

American musicians of Mexican descent
1996 births
Living people
Hispanic and Latino American musicians
Hispanic and Latino American women singers
21st-century American women